The following buildings in Charlotte and Lee counties were added to the National Register of Historic Places as part of the Fish Cabins of Charlotte Harbor Multiple Property Submission (or MPS).

Current listings

|}

See also
Punta Gorda Fish Co.

References

External links
 Charlotte County listings at National Register of Historic Places
 Lee County listings at National Register of Historic Places
 Charlotte County listings at Florida's Office of Cultural and Historical Programs
 Lee County listings at Florida's Office of Cultural and Historical Programs

 Charlotte Harbor Fish Cabins
 Charlotte Harbor Fish Cabins
National Register of Historic Places Multiple Property Submissions in Florida
Recreational fishing in the United States